Stará Ves may refer to:

 Stará Ves (Přerov District), a village in the Czech Republic
 Stará Ves (Bruntál District), a village in the Czech Republic